Judge Radhi Hamza al-Radhi was the head of Iraq’s Commission on Public Integrity. He believes that corruption has cost Iraq £9 billion in the past three years and that most of the money has ended up in the hands of the sectarian militias.

On October 4, 2007, al-Radhi appeared before the U.S. House Committee on Oversight and Government Reform and accused the government of Prime Minister Nuri Kamal al-Maliki of protecting corrupt employees and of actively attempting to "eradicate or control the Commission" and refusing to recognize the independence of the Commission on Public Integrity in violation of the Iraqi Constitution. The government responded by announcing they would sue al-Radhi for smuggling official documents, defaming the prime minister, and corruption.

He was granted asylum in the United States in July 2008.

References

External links
 Iraq’s ousted corruption buster seeks asylum in America
 Exile condemns Iraqi 'corruption'
 "Is Maliki's corruption worth American lives?" by Representative Henry A. Waxman (D-Beverly Hills) the chairman of the House Committee on Oversight and Government Reform.
 Corruption Investigations
 US House Overwhelmingly Approves Measure on Iraq Corruption
 ‘Eliot Ness of Iraq’ Wins Asylum

Living people
20th-century Iraqi lawyers
Iraqi exiles
Year of birth missing (living people)
21st-century Iraqi lawyers
Iraqi emigrants to the United States